Diogo Roberto Roque (born October 13, 1986 in Chavantes), known as Diogo Roque, is a Brazilian footballer who plays as midfielder for Batel.

Career statistics

References

External links

Diogo Roque at ZeroZero

1986 births
Living people
Brazilian footballers
Association football midfielders
Clube de Regatas Brasil players
Paraná Clube players
Iraty Sport Club players
Brusque Futebol Clube players
Campeonato Brasileiro Série D players
Campeonato Brasileiro Série C players
Campeonato Brasileiro Série B players